Darisleydis Amador Rodríguez (born January 1, 1988 in Matanzas) is a Cuban sprint canoeist. She won a silver medal in the women's K-1 200 metres at the 2011 Pan American Games in Guadalajara, Mexico by thirty-seven thousandths of a second (0.037) behind winner Carrie Johnson of the United States, with a time of 41.840 seconds.

Amador represented Cuba at the 2012 Summer Olympics in London, where she competed only in two individual sprint kayak events. For her first event, the women's K-1 500 metres, Amador paddled to a seventh-place finish in the semi-final rounds, but fell short in her bid for the final by approximately four seconds behind Canada's Émilie Fournel, with a time of 1:58.762. In the first ever women's K-1 200 metres, Amador finished fourth and twelfth overall in the B-final by twenty-five thousandths of a second (0.025) behind Serbia's Nikolina Moldovan, attaining her best Olympic time of 45.099 seconds.

References

External links
NBC Olympics Profile

1988 births
Cuban female canoeists
Living people
Olympic canoeists of Cuba
Canoeists at the 2012 Summer Olympics
Canoeists at the 2011 Pan American Games
Pan American Games silver medalists for Cuba
Pan American Games bronze medalists for Cuba
Sportspeople from Matanzas
Pan American Games medalists in canoeing
Medalists at the 2011 Pan American Games